LACNIC (Latin America and Caribbean Network Information Centre;) is the regional Internet registry for the Latin American and Caribbean regions.

LACNIC provides number resource allocation and registration services that support the global operation of the Internet. It is a not-for-profit, membership-based organisation whose members include Internet Service Providers,  and similar organisations.

Functions
LACNIC's main functions are:
 Allocating IPv4 and IPv6 address space, and Autonomous System Numbers
 Maintaining the public Whois Database for the Latin American and Caribbean region
 Reverse DNS delegations
 Representing the interests of the Latin American and Caribbean Internet community on the global stage

Formation
Since 1993, academic organizations in Latin America like ENRED – Foro de Redes de América Latina y el Caribe, discussed the need of a register for Latin America, independent from the influence of the United States. In 1998 during an ENRED meeting in Panama including NIC-MX, this theme was discussed and they learned that another group formed by commercial organizations like CABASE (Cámara Argentina de Base de Datos y Servicio en Línea) and ECOM-LAC (Latin America and Caribbean Federation for Internet and Electronic Commerce), were also discussing the idea of a Latin American registry.

On January 30, 1998, Ira Magaziner, then the senior adviser to President Clinton for policy development, released a discussion paper, known as the "green paper" after the DNS root authority incident. A revised version known as the "white paper" was released on June 5. This paper proposed a new organization to handle internet resources (that later became ICANN). The International Forum for the White Paper organized four meetings, the final one in Buenos Aires was attended by South American communication organizations.

Those organizations joined by ECOM-LAC, argued that Latin American IPs addresses could be handled by a local entity and the agreement for creation of LACNIC was signed in Santiago, Chile, on August 22, 1999, during the second ICANN meeting.

An Interim Board was defined with six members:
 AHCIET (Ibero American Association of Research Centers and Telecommunication Companies), Raimundo Beca
 CABASE (Argentine Chamber of Databases and Online Services), Jorge Plano, later substituted by Oscar Messano
 CGI.br, José Luis Ribeiro
 ENRED (Network Forum for Latin America and the Caribbean), Julian Dunayerich; later substituted by Raul Echeverria
 NIC.mx (NIC Mexico), German Valdez
 ECOM-LAC, Fabio Marinho

The agreement to form LACNIC was submitted on August 26, 1999, to Esther Dyson, then Chair of ICANN Interim Board, and the business plan was presented to ARIN. Statutes were created and it was decided that LACNIC headquarters would be in Montevideo, with technicians and equipment in São Paulo, at the NIC.br premises.LACNIC was established in 2001, with administrative offices in Montevideo, Uruguay, and technical facilities provided by CGI.br of São Paulo. The criteria for a new regional Internet registry was formally recognized by ICANN during its Shanghai meeting in 2002.

Initiatives 

 2004 FRIDA: Aided by various international agencies to provide grants related to various issues such as gender equality in technology.
 2013 AMPARO project: Started for addressing cybersecurity issues across the region via training workshops.

Countries - LACNIC region

Argentina
Aruba
Belize
Bolivia
Brazil
Chile
Colombia
Costa Rica

Cuba
Curaçao
Dominican Republic
Ecuador
El Salvador
Falkland Islands 
French Guiana (France)
Guatemala
Guyana

Haiti
Honduras
Mexico
Netherlands, (Caribbean) (Bonaire, Saba, Sint Eustatius)
Nicaragua
Panama
Paraguay
Peru

Saint Martin
Sint Maarten
South Georgia and the South Sandwich Islands (UK)
Suriname
Trinidad and Tobago
Uruguay
Venezuela

Membership
Today, LACNIC has a total of over 8,500 members in the following categories:

 Active Founding Members: AHCIET, CABASE, CGI-Br, eCOMLAC, ENRED, NIC-Mx
 Active A Members
 Those who receive IP address space directly from LACNIC or indirectly through national registries NIC Brazil and NIC Mexico, as well as those who have received address space from ARIN corresponding to the address space allocated to LACNIC and who apply for admission.
 Adhering Members:
 Organizations based in the LAC region or that carry out their activities mainly in LAC, which are involved in Internet development and/or composed of Internet service providers, make a relevant contribution to Internet-related policies in the region, agree with the goals of LACNIC and apply for admission.
 Organizations that manage IP addresses that are not part of the address space allocated to LAC and are geographically located in the LAC region.
 Any person, company or institution designated as such by decision of the LACNIC Member Assembly in recognition of their activities in furtherance of LACNIC's goals.
 Any natural or legal person who makes a significant financial contribution to support LACNIC.
 Organizations that receive only an ASN do not become LACNIC members.

The Number Resource Organization
With the other RIRs, LACNIC is a member of the Number Resource Organization (NRO), which exists to protect the unallocated number resource pool, to promote and protect the bottom-up policy development process, and to be the focal point for input into the RIR system.

References

External links
Official site

Regional Internet registries
Organizations based in Montevideo
Punta Gorda, Montevideo
Latin America and the Caribbean